Civitanova del Sannio is a comune (municipality) in the Province of Isernia in the Italian region Molise, located about  northwest of Campobasso and about  northeast of Isernia.

Geography
Civitanova del Sannio borders the following municipalities: Bagnoli del Trigno, Chiauci, Duronia, Frosolone, Pescolanciano, Pietrabbondante, Poggio Sannita, Salcito, Sessano del Molise.

References

External links

Cities and towns in Molise